Omar Kolawole Olufemi Sowunmi (born 7 November 1995) is an English footballer who plays as a defender for  club Bromley. Primarily a defender, Sowunmi has been used as a striker in the past.

Career

Ipswich Town
Born in Colchester, Essex, Sowunmi is a graduate of the Ipswich Town academy, after impressing for the club's U18 and U21 sides he was rewarded with a one-year professional contract upon the completion of his academy scholarship in May 2014. On 17 October 2014, Sowunmi joined Conference National side Braintree Town on a month's youth loan. Sowunmi made four appearances in all competitions during his month on loan with the Essex side before returning to Ipswich in November. He then joined Conference South side Lowestoft Town on loan in January 2015. Sowunmi loan was eventually extended to the end of the 2014–15 season and he made a total of fifteen league appearances for Lowestoft, and appeared twice and scored in the final of the Suffolk Premier Cup.

Yeovil Town
With Lowestoft keen to sign Sowunmi permanently upon the expiry of his contract, the defender also had a trial with Exeter City, and was amongst a host of trialists to feature in an end of season trial match at Yeovil Town. Having impressed manager Paul Sturrock, on 24 June 2015, Sowunmi signed a one-year contract with League Two side Yeovil Town. Sowunmi made his debut for Yeovil as a substitute in Yeovil's 1–0 defeat against York City, on 18 August 2015. He scored his first goal for Yeovil against Morecambe on 5 September 2015.

He was offered a new contract by Yeovil at the end of the 2017–18 season. He was captain during the 2018–19 season.

Colchester United
On 1 July 2019, Sowunmi signed for his hometown club Colchester United for an undisclosed fee. He made his club debut on 20 August, coming on as a substitute for Luke Norris in Colchester's 2–2 League Two draw at Grimsby Town.

After 30 appearances for the club, Sowunmi was released at the end of his contract in May 2021.

Bromley
On 16 August 2021, Sowunmi signed for Bromley following a successful trial period with the club.

Personal life
Sowunmi was born in England to a Nigerian father and an English mother.

Career statistics

Honours
Lowestoft Town
 Suffolk Premier Cup: 2014–15

Bromley
FA Trophy: 2021–22

References

External links

1995 births
Living people
English footballers
English people of Nigerian descent
Ipswich Town F.C. players
Braintree Town F.C. players
Lowestoft Town F.C. players
Yeovil Town F.C. players
Colchester United F.C. players
Bromley F.C. players
National League (English football) players
English Football League players
Association football defenders